Mecyclothorax sinuatus is a species of ground beetle in the subfamily Psydrinae. It was described by Liebherr in 2012.

References

anaana
Beetles described in 2012